Pterostylis nutans, commonly known as the nodding greenhood or the parrot's beak orchid, is a species of orchid endemic to eastern Australia. Nodding greenhoods have flowers which "nod" or lean forwards strongly, have a deeply notched sinus and a curved, hairy labellum.

Description
The leaves are dark green,  have a wavy edge and a distinct petiole. There is a wide gap at each side of the flower between the petals and the lateral sepals. Flowering occurs from March to December.

Taxonomy and naming
Pterostylis nutans was first described in 1810 by Robert Brown and the description was published in Prodromus Florae Novae Hollandiae et Insulae Van Diemen. The specific epithet (nutans) is a Latin word meaning "nodding" or "drooping".

Distribution and habitat
Nodding greenhoods often occur in large colonies in moist, protected forest environments and is native to the Australian states of South Australia, Tasmania, Victoria, New South Wales and Queensland as well as the Australian Capital Territory. In Queensland it grows as far north as the Atherton Tableland, in the eastern half of New South Wales, the southern half of Victoria, the south-eastern corner of South Australia and in Tasmania, including King and Flinders Islands. It has also been found in New Zealand but is regarded as a vagrant there because the insect pollinator is not present in that country. There is a single population remaining near the Waihaha River, although there have been records from Kaitaia and Castor Bay.

Ecology
This greenhood is pollinated by a particular species of fungus gnat, attracted by a kairomone produced by the flower's labellum. The labellum tips the insect into the flower, and in attempting to escape, it comes into contact with the sexual organs of the flower and pollination occurs.

Use in horticulture
Pterostylis nutans is easily grown in pots containing a free-draining, sandy mix. The plants require regular watering during their growing period, to be kept dry during dormancy and to be repotted annually.

References

nutans
Orchids of the Australian Capital Territory
Orchids of New South Wales
Orchids of Queensland
Orchids of South Australia
Orchids of Tasmania
Orchids of Victoria (Australia)
Plants described in 1810